The Super Conserved Receptor Expressed in Brain (SREB) family are a group of related G-protein coupled receptors. Since no endogenous ligands have yet been identified for these receptors, they are classified as orphan receptors. Receptors within the group include SREB1 (GPR27), SREB2 (GPR85), and SREB3 (GPR173).

References

External links
 IUPHAR GPCR Database - GPR27 (previously SREB1)
 IUPHAR GPCR Database - GPR85 (previously SREB2)
 IUPHAR GPCR Database - GPR173 (previously SREB3)
 
 

G protein-coupled receptors